John Rose (died 1591), of Canterbury, Kent, was an English politician.

Career
Rose was a tailor who was active in the local politics of Canterbury as an alderman in 1569 and mayor of the city for 1574–75 and 1583–84.

He was elected a Member of Parliament (MP) for Canterbury in 1584 and 1586.

He married the widow Ursula Stuard in 1557 and had no children.

References

 

Year of birth missing
1591 deaths
People from Canterbury
Mayors of Canterbury
English MPs 1584–1585
English MPs 1586–1587